The Borough of Swindon is a local government authority in South West England, centred on the urban area and town of Swindon and forming part of the ceremonial county of Wiltshire.

History 
In 1974 the Thamesdown district of Wiltshire was created from the areas of the municipal borough of Swindon (created 1900) and Highworth Rural District (created 1894). On 1 April 1997 it was made administratively independent of Wiltshire County Council, and its council became a unitary authority. The council adopted the name Swindon on 24 April 1997. The former Thamesdown name and logo continued to be used by the municipal bus operator, Thamesdown Transport, until 2017 when it was sold and renamed to "Swindon's Bus Company".

Geography
The borough of Swindon occupies an area forming the north east corner of Wiltshire and is bordered by two other counties, Gloucestershire (to the north) and Oxfordshire (to the east). West Berkshire is also only a short distance from the borough's south eastern tip.
The generally hilly landscape is sculpted by the upper Thames guiding the northern border, small tributaries draining into the Thames, and the Marlborough Downs rising toward the south.

The borough encompasses the Swindon urban area and surrounding countryside to the north, east and south, including the town of Highworth. It comprises the former Swindon Municipal Borough and a further 18 civil parishes:

 Bishopstone (with Hinton Parva)
 Blunsdon
 Castle Eaton
 Chiseldon
 Covingham
 Hannington
 Haydon Wick
 Highworth (town and surrounding district)
 Inglesham
 Liddington
 Nythe, Eldene and Liden
 St Andrews 
 South Marston
 Stanton Fitzwarren
 Stratton St Margaret
 Wanborough
 West Swindon
 Wroughton

Since 1 April 2017 the entire Borough has been parished, following the establishment of West Swindon parish and the creation of Central Swindon North and Central Swindon South (styled by its parish council as South Swindon). The two Central parishes fall within the boundaries of the town and former municipal borough, the Great Western Main Line railway forming the boundary between them.

At the same time:

 the part of Chiseldon parish north of the M4, including the former hamlet of Coate, was transferred to Central Swindon South;
 the parish of Blunsdon St Andrew was divided into St Andrews and Blunsdon, the A419 forming the boundary between them;
 the parish of Nythe was expanded to form Nythe, Eldene and Liden.

Swindon Borough Council

The council follows a leader and cabinet model and has 57 members elected by 20 wards. Elections are held in three out of every four years, with one-third of the seats being elected at each election. From the first election in 1996 to the 2000 election, Labour had a majority on the council. Following a period where no party had a majority, the Conservatives gained a majority at the 2003 election and have held control since then.

Other elections 
The borough is divided into two Parliamentary constituencies: North Swindon and South Swindon. Both are seen as key marginal seats at general elections, having been bellwether seats since 1997 when they were created. Currently both seats are held by the Conservative Party.

The borough was one of the first areas to declare in the 2016 European Union membership referendum. 61,745 (54.3%) voters supported leaving the European Union, whilst 51,220 (45.7%) wished to remain.

See also
 History of local government in Swindon

References

 
Local government districts of Wiltshire
Unitary authority districts of England
Boroughs in England